"One Thing Leads to Another" is a song by English new wave band the Fixx, from their album Reach the Beach. It is the band's most successful single outside the UK, reaching number four on the US Billboard Hot 100 in November 1983. It also peaked at number two on the Billboard Rock Top Tracks chart and became a number-one hit in Canada. Vocalist Cy Curnin has described the song as an indictment of dishonest politicians.

Reception
Cash Box said that the "uptempo, almost poppy feel is balanced by Cy Cumin’s strong vocalizing and the sobriety of the subject matter."

Legacy
It appears in a 2022 TV commercial for ADP.

Music video
The video, co-produced and directed by Jeannette Obstoj, begins at a science lab where Adam Woods is looking into a microscope observing a new dimension (the wrist shackle in the video on the wall is seen on the cover of Reach the Beach). It shows a dimension in a black tunnel with lights on top where Cy Curnin is dancing in a classy navy blue double-breasted suit and open-necked white shirt. He is then in a bright tube, wearing a gray sleeveless shirt with his arms and shoulders exposed. Then, in a blue tunnel, he is running with a dog. It ends with the tunnel in a three-dimensional angle to see throughout the tube with the band members singing the rest of the song.

Personnel
Cy Curnin – vocals
Adam Woods – percussion, drums
Rupert Greenall – keyboards
Jamie West-Oram – guitar

Additional musicians
Alfie Agius – bass

Charts

Weekly charts

Year-end charts

See also 

 List of number-one singles of 1983 (Canada)

References

1983 singles
The Fixx songs
RPM Top Singles number-one singles
1983 songs
Song recordings produced by Rupert Hine
MCA Records singles